The Villa Torre Clementina is a historic mansion in Roquebrune-Cap-Martin, France. It was built in 1904 for author Ernesta Stern. It was designed by architect Lucien Hesse, and the interiors were designed by painter Raffaële Maïnella. It was used as a shooting location for the 1964 film Joy House. It has been listed as an official historical monument by the French Ministry of Culture since 1991.

References

Houses completed in 1904
Monuments historiques of Alpes-Maritimes
Stern family (banking)
20th-century architecture in France